Maurice Watkins (born August 29, 1956) is a former boxer from Houston, Texas. Nicknamed Termite, he was born into a family that was in the insect killing business, and he is a professional fumigator.

Professional Boxing Career
Watkins turned professional as a boxer on May 21, 1974, beating Cesar Cortez by knockout in round one at Houston. Through his career, Watkins fought some of the best fighters in the Lightweight and Jr. Welterweight divisions. He beat Marion Thomas by a knockout in round seven, Rocky Ramon by a decision in twelve, Arturo Leon by decision in ten, Bruce Strauss by knockout in three, Bobby Rodriguez by knockout in one, and others. His fight with former United States Lightweight champion Norman Goins resulted in a three-round no contest. He also lost to Olympic gold medalist Howard Davis Jr. and Alfredo Escalera. On October 2 of 1980, at the Caesars Palace hotel in Las Vegas, Nevada, he got his only world title shot, losing to Saoul Mamby by a fifteen-round decision for the WBC's world Jr. Welterweight title. He retired with 61 wins, 5 losses, 2 draws (tie), one no contest and 48 wins by knockout.

Professional boxing record

|-
|align="center" colspan=8|61 Wins (42 knockouts, 19 decisions), 5 Losses (0 knockouts, 5 decisions), 2 Draws, 1 No Contest 
|-
| align="center" style="border-style: none none solid solid; background: #e3e3e3"|Result
| align="center" style="border-style: none none solid solid; background: #e3e3e3"|Record
| align="center" style="border-style: none none solid solid; background: #e3e3e3"|Opponent
| align="center" style="border-style: none none solid solid; background: #e3e3e3"|Type
| align="center" style="border-style: none none solid solid; background: #e3e3e3"|Round
| align="center" style="border-style: none none solid solid; background: #e3e3e3"|Date
| align="center" style="border-style: none none solid solid; background: #e3e3e3"|Location
| align="center" style="border-style: none none solid solid; background: #e3e3e3"|Notes
|-align=center
|Win
|
|align=left| Yaqui Hernandez
|PTS
|6
|16/03/1990
|align=left| Phoenix, Arizona, United States
|align=left|
|-
|Win
|
|align=left| Robert "The Line" Dixon
|TKO
|2
|17/02/1990
|align=left| Conroe, Texas, United States
|align=left|
|-
|Win
|
|align=left| Joe "Attorney" Garcia
|PTS
|10
|11/12/1989
|align=left| Pasadena Convention Center, Pasadena, Texas, United States
|align=left|
|-
|Win
|
|align=left| Moses "Governor" Robinson
|KO
|2
|05/10/1989
|align=left| Houston, Texas, United States
|align=left|
|-
|Win
|
|align=left| "Candlelight" Virgil Green
|KO
|3
|10/08/1989
|align=left| Billings, Montana, United States
|align=left|
|-
|Win
|
|align=left| Raymundo Lopez
|KO
|2
|20/07/1989
|align=left| Tucson Convention Center, Tucson, Arizona, United States
|align=left|
|-
|Win
|
|align=left|Carlos "Rocky" Gonzalez
|KO
|1
|01/06/1989
|align=left| Phoenix, Arizona, United States
|align=left|
|-
|Win
|
|align=left| Anthony "Two Gun" Williams
|PTS
|6
|30/04/1989
|align=left| Galveston, Texas, United States
|align=left|
|-
|Loss
|
|align=left| Alfredo Escalera
|UD
|10
|12/11/1982
|align=left| Orange Bowl, Miami, United States
|align=left|
|-
|Win
|
|align=left| Paul Gentry
|KO
|4
|22/09/1982
|align=left| Houston, United States
|align=left|
|-
|Win
|
|align=left| Jose "J-Rod" Rodriguez
|KO
|10
|27/08/1982
|align=left| Houston, United States
|align=left|
|-
|Win
|
|align=left| Bruce Strauss
|KO
|3
|17/08/1982
|align=left| Blackham Coliseum, Lafayette, Louisiana, United States
|align=left|
|-
|Win
|
|align=left| Billy "The Kid" Smith
|KO
|3
|21/07/1982
|align=left| Shreveport, Louisiana, United States
|align=left|
|-
|Loss
|
|align=left| Saoul Mamby
|UD
|15
|02/10/1980
|align=left| Caesars Palace, Las Vegas, United States
|align=left|
|-
|Win
|
|align=left| Larry "Legend" Moore
|KO
|3
|22/05/1980
|align=left| Holland, Michigan, United States
|align=left|
|-
|Win
|
|align=left| Sammy Rookard
|KO
|4
|06/04/1980
|align=left| Astro Arena, Houston, United States
|align=left|
|-
|Win
|
|align=left| Nathan "Famous" Davis
|KO
|3
|22/03/1980
|align=left| Grand Rapids, Michigan, United States
|align=left|
|-
|Win
|
|align=left| Jimmy "Wakeboard" Martinez
|KO
|1
|09/01/1980
|align=left| Holland, Michigan, United States
|align=left|
|-
|Loss
|
|align=left| Howard Davis, Jr.
|UD
|10
|14/09/1979
|align=left| Houston Summit, Houston, Texas, United States
|align=left|
|-
|Win
|
|align=left| Roberto "Baby" Perez
|KO
|7
|15/08/1979
|align=left| Beaumont Civic Center, Beaumont, Texas, United States
|align=left|
|-
|Draw
|
|align=left| Teodoro Osuna
|PTS
|10
|09/03/1979
|align=left| Madison Square Garden, New York City, United States
|align=left|
|-
|Win
|
|align=left| Richie Lee Roberts
|KO
|3
|16/01/1979
|align=left| Houston, United States
|align=left|
|-
|Win
|
|align=left| Arthur "Space Odyssey" Clarke
|KO
|7
|09/12/1978
|align=left| Houston, United States
|align=left|
|-
|Win
|
|align=left| Gary "Black" Smith
|KO
|5
|02/11/1978
|align=left| Orlando, Florida, United States
|align=left|
|-
|Win
|
|align=left| Rick Craney
|KO
|1
|15/08/1978
|align=left| Houston, United States
|align=left|
|-
|Win
|
|align=left| Joe Medrano
|KO
|7
|16/05/1978
|align=left| Houston, United States
|align=left|
|-
|Win
|
|align=left| John "Wolf" Morgan
|KO
|4
|20/04/1978
|align=left| Houston, United States
|align=left|
|-
|Win
|
|align=left| Hilbert Stevenson
|PTS
|10
|11/04/1978
|align=left| Orlando, Florida, United States
|align=left|
|-
|Win
|
|align=left| Benny Marquez
|PTS
|10
|19/01/1978
|align=left| Houston, United States
|align=left|
|-
|Win
|
|align=left| Steve "Hammer" Homan
|PTS
|10
|01/12/1977
|align=left| Houston, United States
|align=left|
|-
|Win
|
|align=left| Freddie "Stepper" Harris
|PTS
|10
|25/10/1977
|align=left| Orlando, Florida, United States
|align=left|
|-
|Win
|
|align=left| Cuyo Mendoza
|TKO
|3
|27/09/1977
|align=left| Orlando, Florida, United States
|align=left|
|-
|Win
|
|align=left| Paulino Garcia
|TKO
|5
|22/09/1977
|align=left| Curtis Hixon Hall, Tampa, Florida, United States
|align=left|
|-
|Win
|
|align=left| Ernesto Ortega
|KO
|7
|26/07/1977
|align=left| Orlando, Florida, United States
|align=left|
|-
|No Contest
|
|align=left| "Stormin" Norman Goins
|ND
|10
|22/03/1977
|align=left| Memorial Coliseum, Corpus Christi, Texas, United States
|align=left|
|-
|Win
|
|align=left| Jose "Speedy" Gonzalez
|PTS
|10
|16/02/1977
|align=left| Orlando, Florida, United States
|align=left|
|-
|Loss
|
|align=left| Augustin Estrada
|UD
|10
|17/11/1976
|align=left| Convention Center Arena, San Antonio, United States
|align=left|
|-
|Win
|
|align=left| Otto Breeding
|KO
|3
|26/10/1976
|align=left| Orlando, Florida, United States
|align=left|
|-
|Win
|
|align=left| Arturo Leon
|UD
|10
|21/09/1976
|align=left| Corpus Christi, Texas, United States
|align=left|
|-
|Win
|
|align=left| Rocky Ramon
|PTS
|12
|31/08/1976
|align=left| Corpus Christi, Texas, United States
|align=left|
|-
|Win
|
|align=left| Agustin Estrada
|TKO
|7
|09/08/1976
|align=left| Municipal Auditorium, New Orleans, United States
|align=left|
|-
|Win
|
|align=left| Richie Puentes
|KO
|6
|24/07/1976
|align=left| Biloxi, Mississippi, United States
|align=left|
|-
|Loss
|
|align=left| Adriano Marrero
|SD
|10
|16/03/1976
|align=left| Miami Beach Convention Center, Miami Beach, Florida, United States
|align=left|
|-
|Win
|
|align=left| Valente Ramos
|KO
|3
|09/03/1976
|align=left| Orlando, Florida, United States
|align=left|
|-
|Win
|
|align=left| Lamar Baskin
|KO
|2
|24/02/1976
|align=left| Albuquerque Civic Auditorium, Albuquerque, New Mexico, United States
|align=left|
|-
|Win
|
|align=left|Chamaco Cuenca
|KO 
|5
|10/02/1976
|align=left| Miami Beach Convention Center, Miami Beach, Florida, United States
|align=left|
|-
|Win
|
|align=left| Juan "and Only" Hidalgo
|UD
|10
|20/01/1976
|align=left| Miami Beach Convention Center, Miami Beach, Florida, United States
|align=left|
|-
|Win
|
|align=left| Bobby Flores
|TKO
|6
|18/11/1975
|align=left| Houston, United States
|align=left|
|-
|Win
|
|align=left| Larry Peterson
|KO
|5
|19/08/1975
|align=left| Orlando, Florida, United States
|align=left|
|-
|Win
|
|align=left| Gene Prado
|UD
|10
|29/07/1975
|align=left| Circle Star Theater, San Carlos, California, United States
|align=left|
|-
|Win
|
|align=left| Marion "Tiger" Thomas
|KO
|7
|16/07/1975
|align=left| Houston, United States
|align=left|
|-
|Win
|
|align=left| Victor de la Cruz
|UD
|10
|17/06/1975
|align=left| San Jose Civic Auditorium, San Jose, California, United States
|align=left|
|-
|Win
|
|align=left| Leroy Walker
|TKO
|8
|21/05/1975
|align=left| Circle Star Theater, San Carlos, California, United States
|align=left|
|-
|Win
|
|align=left| Rudy Gonzalez
|PTS
|10
|06/05/1975
|align=left| San Jose, California, United States
|align=left|
|-
|Win
|
|align=left| Otis Locklear
|KO
|3
|22/04/1975
|align=left| Orlando, Florida, United States
|align=left|
|-
|Win
|
|align=left| Mike Whymms
|PTS
|8
|15/04/1975
|align=left| Orlando, Florida, United States
|align=left|
|-
|Win
|
|align=left| Gilbert "Machete" Galvan
|PTS
|10
|17/02/1975
|align=left| Memorial Coliseum, Corpus Christi, Texas, United States
|align=left|
|-
|Win
|
|align=left| Dave Kibby
|UD
|8
|29/01/1975
|align=left| Cow Palace, San Francisco, United States
|align=left|
|-
|Win
|
|align=left| Vicente Hernandez
|PTS
|10
|17/01/1975
|align=left| San Jose Civic Auditorium, San Jose, California, United States
|align=left|
|-
|Win
|
|align=left| "Sugar" Ray Sears
|PTS
|6
|17/12/1974
|align=left| Orlando, Florida, United States
|align=left|
|-
|Win
|
|align=left| Robert "Baby" Perez
|KO
|1
|10/11/1974
|align=left| Corpus Christi, Texas, United States
|align=left|
|-
|Win
|
|align=left| Bobby Rodriguez
|KO
|1
|13/10/1974
|align=left| Corpus Christi, Texas, United States
|align=left|
|-
|Win
|
|align=left| Ricky Ramos
|KO
|4
|26/08/1974
|align=left| Corpus Christi, Texas, United States
|align=left|
|-
|Win
|
|align=left| Nick Alfaro
|PTS
|8
|18/08/1974
|align=left| Houston, United States
|align=left|
|-
|Win
|
|align=left| Arturo Cirillos
|KO
|3
|05/08/1974
|align=left| Corpus Christi, Texas, United States
|align=left|
|-
|Win
|
|align=left| Harvey "Candyman" Wilson
|KO
|6
|16/07/1974
|align=left| Houston, United States
|align=left|
|-
|Win
|
|align=left| Arturo Cirillos
|TKO
|4
|02/07/1974
|align=left| Houston, United States
|align=left|
|-
|Win
|
|align=left| Lupe Cantù
|KO
|3
|04/06/1974
|align=left| Houston, United States
|align=left|
|-
|Win
|
|align=left|Cesar Cortez
|KO
|1
|21/05/1974
|align=left| Houston, United States
|align=left|
|}

After Boxing
After retiring, Watkins went back to Texas to work as a fumigator. He remained in obscurity there for many years.

In 2003, the American military, needing personnel to work rebuilding Iraq's infrastructure, contracted him as a fumigator to work on Iraqi homes that had been decaying and infected with insects during Saddam Hussein's presidency. The military did not know of Watkins' background as a boxer.

In 2008, writer Suzy Pepper, a former neighbor of Maurice Watkins, released "Termite", a biographical book about Watkins. Also in 2008, a movie based on the book was announced.

Termine currently speaks at events as a motivational speaker with emphasis on safety.

Houston television news reports that he was hospitalized in Houston fighting Coronavirus COVID-19 and overcame the illness after 18 days in the hospital. He has since fully recovered and continues to focus on the movie, oil and gas industry, and spending time with his wife and family.

In Iraq
After the IOC announced that Iraq would be allowed to compete in seven sports at the 2004 Olympics in Athens, including boxing, the United States military, overviewing the new Iraqi Olympic committee, set about to find a new boxing coach for the Iraqi national boxing team. With research, they found out about Watkins' background, and invited him to coach a team of young hopefuls in Baghdad. When Watkins arrived there, he saw what he described to a Sports Illustrated columnist as not too much talent, but a lot of heart.

Realizing he needed to train the team in a setting different from Baghdad, he moved his team to a city close to Baghdad, but much quieter than the capital city. He trained nine Iraqi boxers who hoped to reach the Olympics, but, out of those, only Najah Ali was able to qualify for the games.

During the training period of these young prospects, he invented a phrase that has become widely popular in Iraq: Every morning, after arrival to the gym, he would chant Iraq! Iraq! Iraq is back! to help inspire his boxers. The phrase has become so popular in Iraq that the United States military has ordered 1,000 T-shirts to be printed with the phrase, to be handled among Iraqi citizens.

Notes

External links
 

1956 births
Living people
Boxers from Texas
Place of birth missing (living people)
American male boxers
Boxing in Iraq